The following is a list of 1999 Seattle Mariners draft picks. The Mariners took part in both the Rule 4 draft (June amateur draft) and the Rule 5 draft. The Mariners made 52 selections in the 1999 draft, the first being catcher Ryan Christianson in the first round. In all, the Mariners selected 29 pitchers, 8 outfielders, 6 shortstops, 3 catchers, 3 first basemen, 2 third basemen, and 1 second baseman.

Draft

Key

Table

Rule 5 draft

Key

Table

References
General references

Inline citations

External links
Seattle Mariners official website